K. T. Kumaran (1 July 1927 – 13 May 2008) was an Indian politician and leader of Communist Party of India. He represented Hosdurg constituency in 5th, 6th and 7th Kerala Legislative Assembly.

References

Communist Party of India politicians from Kerala